Abdul Baten Mojumdar Komol (born 2 August 1987) is a retired Bangladeshi international footballer who last played as a striker for Arambagh KS.

Club career
Abdul Baten started his professional career during 2005 JFA Cup. He later went on to make his league debut with Fakirerpool YMFC the same year. In 2009, Abdul Baten had a big contribution in winning Mohammedan's first Super Cup in 2013. He last played club football for Arambagh KS in 2020.

International career
Komol debuted for Bangladesh on SAFF 2008, where he played all 3 games, wearing number 20. He also played for Bangladesh during the 2014 FIFA World Cup qualifying rounds. He scored his first goal for national team in 2011, in a match against Myanmar, in AFC Challenge Cup qualifiers.

After retirement
Abdul Baten graduated in Civil Engineering, however decided to stick with football even after his playing career ended. After retiring from playing professional football in 2020, Komol completed AFC 'C' License Coaches Course in October of the same year. Komol started his coaching career in his hometown with Chagalnaiya Pilot High School of Feni, during the 2000 National School Football Championship. He had also started his journey of becoming a professional footballer while studying at the same high school.

International goals
Scores and results list Bangladesh's goal tally first.

References

External links

1987 births
Living people
Footballers from Dhaka
Bangladeshi footballers
Bangladesh international footballers
Mohammedan SC (Dhaka) players
Sheikh Jamal Dhanmondi Club players
Abahani Limited (Dhaka) players
Abahani Limited (Chittagong) players
Arambagh KS players
Association football forwards
Footballers at the 2010 Asian Games
Asian Games competitors for Bangladesh
South Asian Games gold medalists for Bangladesh
South Asian Games medalists in football